Lucius Vitruvius Cerdo was an ancient Roman architect active in Verona.  His only known work is the Arco dei Gavi, a 1st-century arch in Verona, Italy. The arch is inscribed "Lucius Vitruvius Cerdo, a freedman of Lucius", which has led to Verona being suggested as the birthplace of the earlier and better-known architect Marcus Vitruvius Pollio.

References

1st-century Romans
Ancient Roman architects
History of Verona
Year of death unknown
Year of birth unknown
Architects from Verona